The Uruguayan Championship 1914 was the 14th season of Uruguay's top-flight football league.

Overview
The tournament consisted of a two-wheel championship of all against all. It involved eight teams, and the champion was River Plate F.C. which won its second consecutive title and fourth championship in just seven years. It was also the last tournament for this team before its ultimate demise.

Before starting the sporting year, the C.U.R.C.C. announced a name change to Club Atlético Peñarol, which sparked controversy many years later. Another club (Nacional) denounced that as two different clubs, claiming that this was a manoeuvre for the new club Peñarol, allowing them to enter the First Division without having to go through the divisions of ascent.

Teams

League standings 

First Final: River Plate F.C. 1-1 Peñarol

Second Final: River Plate F.C. 1-1 Peñarol

Third Final: River Plate F.C. 1-0 Peñarol

References 

Uruguay - List of final tables (RSSSF)

Uruguayan Primera División seasons
Uru
1